Kavach is an automatic train protection (ATP) system indigenously developed by Indian Railways through Research Designs & Standards Organisation (RDSO). Initial development of Kavach started in 2012 under the name Train Collision Avoidance System (TCAS).

The Kavach system is a safety integrity level 4 (SIL-4) certified technology. Once implemented, Kavach will be the world's cheapest automatic train collision protection system, costing 50 lakh rupees per kilometre to operate compared to about two crore rupees worldwide.

History 
The development of India's own automatic protection system or collision avoidance system began in 2012. The project was titled as Train Collision Avoidance System (TCAS). The Kavach system is developed as part of the Indian Railways goal to achieve zero accident. The first field trials were carried out in 2016 and with this feedback, initial specifications of Kavach was formulated by March 2017. The Kavach was subjected to tests by an independent third party assessor in the subsequent years.

Working
The system consists of a set of electronic devices and radio frequency identification devices installed in locomotives, tracks, railway signalling system and every stations at a 1 km distance. The system currently communicates with its components via ultra-high radio frequencies while the development of 4G LTE based system is underway. Kavach alerts when a loco pilot jumps a signal (Signal Passed at Danger -SPAD), which is the leading cause of train collisions. The system can alert the loco pilot and take control of the brakes and bring train movement to a halt automatically when it notices another train on the same line within a prescribed distance. The device continuously monitors train movement and sends signals ahead to the locomotives, which is helpful during adverse weather conditions such as fog. The Kavach incorporates key characteristics of European Train Control System and Indian Anti-collision device.

Demonstration
A live demonstration of working of Kavach happened on March 4, 2022 between Gullaguda and Chitgidda railway stations in Secunderabad Division. Indian Railway minister Ashwini Vaishnaw was travelling in a locomotive in one direction, while Vinay Kumar Tripathi, Chairman and CEO, Railway Board was travelling in another locomotive on the opposite direction on the same track. Kavach system on detecting the locos on same track, applied brakes automatically, thus avoided collision

Deployment 
The Kavach is already implemented on 65 locomotives, 1445 km route and 134 stations in South Central Railway zone, while implementation on 1200 km is underway. The Kavach automatic protection system will be upgraded to handle 160 kmph top speed before it will be implemented on 3000 km route of New Delhi–Mumbai main line and Howrah–Delhi main line as part of Mission Raftar project of the Indian Railway.

The Union budget of India for the FY 2022-23 allocated fund for speedy implementation of Kavach system on 2000 km track, and sanctioned implementation on 34,000 km track of Golden Quadrilateral rail route.

Newly built WAG-9HH will be equipped with Kavach automatic protection system, these locomotives are designed for a top speed of 120 kmph.

References

External links
 Handbook on Train Collision Avoidance System (TCAS) - An Indigenous ATP System 
 Kavach - Ministry of Railways 

Train protection systems
Indian Railways